Ağ Dağ (Persian: آغ داغ) is the highest peak in Mount Bozgush located in East Azerbaijan Province, Iran, with a height of 3,306 meters (10,846 ft).

Mountains of East Azerbaijan Province